The Men's Macau Open 2014 is the men's edition of the 2014 Macau Open, which is a tournament of the PSA World Tour event International (Prize money: $50,000). The event took place in Macau in China from 23 October to 26 October. Tarek Momen won his first Macau Open trophy, beating Omar Mosaad in the final.

Prize money and ranking points
For 2014, the prize purse was $50,000. The prize money and points breakdown was as follows:

Seeds

Draw and results

See also
PSA World Tour 2014
Women's Macau Open 2014
Macau Open (squash)

References

External links
PSA Macau Open 2013 website

Squash tournaments in Macau
Macau Open
Macau Open (squash)